Félix Mendizábal Mendiburu (7 March 1891 – 15 July 1959) was a Spanish sprinter. He competed at the 1920 and the 1924 Summer Olympics. At the 1924 Games, he was also the flag bearer.

References

External links
 

1891 births
1959 deaths
Athletes (track and field) at the 1920 Summer Olympics
Athletes (track and field) at the 1924 Summer Olympics
Spanish male sprinters
Olympic athletes of Spain
People from Usurbil
Sportspeople from Gipuzkoa
Athletes from the Basque Country (autonomous community)